The Visualise Tour: Live in Concert is a live DVD by Australian singer-songwriter Delta Goodrem. Filmed during The Visualise Tour on 24 July 2005 at the Sydney Superdome, the DVD was released through Sony BMG on 13 November 2005. It debuted at #1 in Australia and was certified platinum four times.

Track listing
"Butterfly"
"Mistaken Identity"
"Lost Without You"
"A Little Too Late"
"Not Me, Not I"
"Will You Fall for Me"
"The Analyst"
"Throw It Away" 
"Predictable"
"Longer"
"Electric Storm"
"Born to Try"
"Last Night on Earth"
"Fragile"
"Almost Here" 
"Flying Without Wings" 
"Miscommunication" 
"I Feel the Earth Move"
"I Don't Care"
"Are You Gonna Be My Boy"
"A Year Ago Today" 
"Extraordinary Day"
"Be Strong"
"Out of the Blue"
"Innocent Eyes"

Special features
Tour documentary
Concert videos:
"The Analyst"
"Here I Am" 
"A Year Ago Today" 
"Be Strong" 
Photo gallery

Charts

Weekly charts

Year-end charts

Certifications

References 

Delta Goodrem video albums
Live video albums
2005 live albums
2005 video albums